Ehsan Adil (born 15 March 1993) is a Pakistani international cricketer. He is a right-hand bat and right-arm fast. He has represented Faisalabad Wolves, Habib Bank Limited cricket team and Pakistan Under-19 cricket team.

Ehsan Adil had played only 12 first-class matches, and was a month shy of his 20th birthday, when he played his first Test match, against South Africa in Centurion. If that's not impressive enough, he dismissed Graeme Smith off his third ball in international cricket, immediately justifying the selection.

The faith in Adil's ability came from his performances in his maiden first-class season, in 2012–13. He was a member of Pakistan's Under-19 team in the 2012 World Cup in Australia, and later that year made his first-class debut for Habib Bank, taking six wickets in his first game. Adil finished as the second-highest wicket-taker in the President's Trophy, the four-day domestic competition, taking 54 wickets at 17.88. Those numbers earned him a place in the Pakistan squad for the Test series in South Africa, and when Junaid Khan and Umar Gul were both unavailable for the Centurion game, Adil walked in for his Test debut in a three-man Pakistan pace attack that had a combined prior experience of two Tests.

In March 2019, he was named in Punjab's squad for the 2019 Pakistan Cup. In September 2019, he was named in Central Punjab's squad for the 2019–20 Quaid-e-Azam Trophy tournament.

References

External links
 

1993 births
Living people
People from Toba Tek Singh District
Pakistani cricketers
Pakistan Test cricketers
Pakistan One Day International cricketers
Faisalabad cricketers
Habib Bank Limited cricketers
Faisalabad Wolves cricketers
Federal Areas cricketers
Cricketers at the 2015 Cricket World Cup
Lahore Qalandars cricketers
Central Punjab cricketers